The Methuselah Foundation is an American-based global non-profit organization, based in Springfield, Virginia, with a declared mission to "make 90 the new 50 by 2030" by supporting tissue engineering and regenerative medicine therapies. The organization was originally incorporated by David Gobel in 2001 as the Performance Prize Society, a name inspired by the British governments Longitude Act, which offered monetary rewards for anyone who could devise a portable, practical solution for determining a ship's longitude.

Founding
In 2003, David Gobel, Aubrey de Grey, and Dane Gobel rebranded the organization Methuselah Foundation, named after Methuselah, the grandfather of Noah in the Hebrew Bible, whose lifespan was recorded as 969 years.

The new name was introduced at the 32nd Annual Meeting of the American Aging Association, where they awarded the first Methuselah Mouse Prize to Andrej Bartke for his work on mice that lived the equivalent of 180 human years.

The Foundation's work includes:
 incubating and investing in early-stage life science companies
 funding scientific research
 providing fiscal sponsorship to aligned projects
 sponsoring inducement prizes.
Throughout its history, the Foundation has helped to reshape the perception of longevity research with the public and the scientific community. When it was launched, the field of longevity science was largely thought to be a playground for eccentrics. Today, anti-aging or longevity research exists in the scientific mainstream and represents a $7 trillion dollar marketplace.

All of the Foundation's grants, investments, prizes and policy decisions follow seven strategies:
 New Parts for People recognizes that age takes a toll on human bodies. The strategy is designed to promote technologies that create replacement parts for human bodies, such as organs, cartilage, bones, and vasculature.
 Get the crud out acknowledges that cellular processes can result in harmful byproducts over time. The strategy promotes technologies to clear harmful substances from the body.
 Renew the rivers recognizes that nervous and circulatory systems get less effective with age. Nerve cells may pass messages more slowly and chemicals and waste can collect in the brain tissue as nerve cells break down. In the circulatory system, vessels stiffen, the heart pumps less effectively, system waste clearance slows and oxygen exchange deteriorates. This strategy addresses the need to improve these age factors, to restore circulatory system function.
 Debug the code acknowledges that, as the body ages, its DNA and RNA are damaged. This strategy seeks to return the code to a youthful state.
 Restock the shelves reflects the fact that, as people age, they are less able to eliminate harmful cells and replace them with healthy ones. The strategy aims to provide older bodies with the tools needed to rebuild and protect.
 Lust for life recognizes that aging often leads to a sense of isolation, hopelessness and uselessness. This strategy addresses the need to restore the sensory organs, sight, taste, smell, touch, and hearing, while eliminating the aches and pains associated with advancing age. It also aims to help older people to want to lengthen their lives, and to empower them to make the most of a longer life.
 Rebuild the walls is focused on the fact that people's skin, cell walls and other barriers are under assault by decades of wear and tear, which results in decreased sensation, increased response time, chronic inflammation and frailty. This strategy focuses on developing technologies to restore the integrity of and rebuild the body's walls, from the nerve fiber fascia to the skin.

Current projects

Methuselah Funds 
The Methuselah Funds (M Fund) was created in 2017 as an LLC subsidiary of the Methuselah Foundation to incubate and invest in early-stage companies.

The entity operates as the mechanism through which the Foundation turns its vision into reality by identifying young companies whose research promises to transform the human lifespan, providing them with seed funds to underwrite their work and supporting them with ongoing business counsel. In this way, M Fund operates much like a business incubator to help young startups focus and build, and a business accelerator to help more mature organizations develop or acquire the resources needed to sustain their growth.

Strategic counsel is typically provided by Foundation Founder and M Fund CEO David Gobel and M Fund Co-Founder and Managing Director Sergio Ruiz.

Like traditional venture funds, the M Fund aims to maximize the business success of a portfolio company inline with strategic liquidity events. However, unlike those organizations, it is primarily focused on maximizing what it calls “return on mission,” which it defines as extending the healthy human lifespan. As such, the M Fund strives to support real-world products and therapies that can help any patient come to market.   Through the years, Gobel and Ruiz have led investments in:
 Organovo, a company working in the field of 3D bioprinting;
 Silverstone Solutions, a maker of kidney-matching software that enables hospitals and transplant organizations to more quickly and accurately pair patients with compatible donors (acquired by BiologicTx in 2013);
 Oisin Biotechnologies, a company aiming to remove senescent cells, commonly seen as a hallmark of aging;
 Leucadia Therapeutics, a company working to address Alzheimer's disease by restoring the flow of cerebrospinal fluid across the cribriform plate.
 OncoSenX, a spinout of Osin, which is developing transient gene therapies that can fight solid tumors in cancers like lung and prostate.
 Volumetric, whose 3D bioprinters and bio-links can bioprint tissue 10 times faster that legacy bioprinting methods. In 2021, the company was acquired by 3D Systems, a leader in 3D printing technology for healthcare and industrial uses
 Turn Biotechnologies, which has developed a technology that can safely reprogram how DNA functions epigenetically, effectively restoring cell function that is typically lost as people age.
 Repair Biotechnologies, which is developing treatments for aging and age-related diseases. In 2021, company research showed its preclinical Cholesterol Degrading Platform significantly reversed obstruction of aortic blood vessels by lipid-based plaque in mice.
 Viscient Biosciences, which is working to replace the use of animal research with 3-D printed, manufactured human tissue. The company's goal is to make medical testing more accurate than existing animal studies.
 X-Therma, which is developing breakthroughs to extend the shelf-life of organs from just a few hours to several days, which would reduce the organ shortage that severely restricts the number of transplants performed each year.
 WinSanTor, a company developing a proprietary therapy to prevent and reverse nerve damage related to neuropathy. The company has a drug that is currently in clinical trials.

Nasa Challenge Partnerships 
In 2016, NASA in partnership with the New Organ Alliance announced the Vascular Tissue Challenge. Creating a sufficient blood vessel system – vasculature – is often seen by biomedical researchers as a primary impediment in engineering thick tissues. The Vascular Tissue Challenge offers a $500,000 prize "to be divided among the first three teams that successfully create thick, metabolically-functional human vascularized organ tissue in a controlled laboratory environment." Two teams were awarded prizes for their breakthrough work in 2021.

In November 2016, in conjunction with the Vascular Tissue Challenge, the New Organ Alliance hosted at the NASA Research Park the Vascular Tissue Challenge Roadmapping Workshop, with funding from the NSF.

In 2021, Methuselah announced that a second collaboration with NASA, the Deep Space Food Challenge, awarded $25,000 prizes to each of the 18 U.S. teams that designed a novel food production technology concept that maximizes safe, nutritious and palatable food outputs for long-duration space missions. The competition has entered a second round, in which teams must actually build their technology.

Alliance for Longevity Initiatives 
The Alliance for Longevity Initiatives, whose mission is to create social and political action around the issue of combating age-related chronic conditions and increasing our number of healthy, disease-free years. The organization seeks to build policies that encourage economic and scientific support for more longevity solutions, such as bioengineered patient trials and dramatically improved biomedical research models that use engineered human tissue.

New Parts for People 
Methuselah Foundation contributed $1Million to the Albert Einstein College of Medicine to fund development. Aging is a leading risk factor for most common neurodegenerative diseases, including strokes, brain tumors, aneurysms, cognitive impairments and dementias.

Past projects

3D bioprinter grants 
In 2013, Methuselah Foundation began a partnership with Organovo to fund the use of their 3D bioprinters at academic research centers for biomedical research. Under the grant program, the foundation committed "at least $500,000 in direct funding for research projects across several institutions." The first recipients were Yale School of Medicine, UCSF School of Medicine, and the Murdoch Children's Research Institute.

Methuselah Mouse Prize 
The Methuselah Mouse Prize (Mprize) was created to increase scientific and public interest in longevity research by awarding two cash prizes: "one to the research team that broke the world record for the oldest-ever mouse; and one to the team that developed the most successful late-onset rejuvenation strategy." The Mprize was announced publicly in 2003 by David Gobel and Aubrey de Grey at the American Aging Association. The prize for longevity was first won by a research team led by Andrzej Bartke of Southern Illinois University. The prize for rejuvenation first went to Stephen Spindler of the University of California, Riverside. Additionally, in 2009, the first Mprize Lifespan Achievement Award went to Z. Dave Sharp of the University of Texas Health Science Center at San Antonio for extending the lifespan of already aged mice using the pharmaceutical rapamycin. In May 2014, at the 43rd Annual Meeting of the American Aging Association, Methuselah Foundation awarded a $10,000 Mprize to Huber Warner for his founding of the National Institute on Aging's Interventions Testing Program.

Bowhead whale genome 

In 2015, with funding from the Methuselah Foundation and Life Extension Foundation, the bowhead whale genome was sequenced by João Pedro de Magalhães and his team at the University of Liverpool. The bowhead whale is possibly the longest-lived mammal, capable of living over 200 years. The genome project was undertaken to learn more about the mammal's mechanisms for longevity and resistance to age-related diseases, which are unknown. An assembly of the bowhead whale genome has been made available online to promote further research.

New Organ Alliance 

The Methuselah Foundation fiscally sponsors the New Organ Alliance, an initiative aimed at raising awareness and facilitating research to help alleviate organ donation shortages. In 2013, the foundation announced the New Organ Liver Prize, a $1,000,000 award to the first team that can create a bioengineered or regenerative liver therapy for a "large mammal, enabling the host to recover in the absence of native liver function and survive three months with a normal lifestyle."

The initiative is held in partnership with the Organ Preservation Alliance. New Organ Alliance worked out a technology roadmap report for organ banking and bioengineering solutions to help address organ shortages. The roadmap was developed through a workshop in May 2015 in Washington, D.C., along with a subsequent roundtable held by the Office of Science and Technology Policy. It is funded from the National Science Foundation and Methuselah Foundation. Two follow-up perspectives were published, "The Promise of Organ and Tissue Preservation to Transform Medicine" and "Bioengineering Priorities on a Path to Ending Organ Shortage".

In 2016, NASA in partnership with the New Organ Alliance announced the Vascular Tissue Challenge. Creating a sufficient blood vessel system – vasculature – is often seen by biomedical researchers as a primary impediment in engineering thick tissues. The Vascular Tissue Challenge offers a $500,000 prize "to be divided among the first three teams that successfully create thick, metabolically-functional human vascularized organ tissue in a controlled laboratory environment."

Organ Preservation Alliance 

In 2013, Methuselah began fiscally sponsoring and collaborating with the Organ Preservation Alliance, an initiative coordinating research and stakeholders for the preservation of tissues and organs. The organization's activities have included:
 hosting Organ Banking Summits,
 developing a technology roadmap for organ banking,
 creating the first Organ and Tissue Preservation Community of Practice with the American Society of Transplantation,
 organizing an "Organs on Demand" workshop at the U.S. Military Academy,
 publishing an expert-consensus article on organ preservation in Nature Biotechnology,
 contributing to the Department of Defense's five organ-banking grant programs, seeding an "estimated $15 million into collaborations among 35 groups."
The Organ Preservation Alliance, an initiative coordinating research and stakeholders focused on the preservation of tissues and organs. In 2015, OPA became an independent Tax exempt non-profit organization.

Supercentenarian Research Foundation 

In 2006, Methuselah contributed capital and fiscal sponsorship to launch the Supercentenarian Research Foundation (SRF). SRF was formed to study why supercentenarians, people over 110 years of age, live longer than most, and why they die. Eight autopsies of supercentenarians were conducted by SRF, with six indicating senile cardiac transthyretin amyloidosis at the time of death. With this disease, a defective protein "amasses in and clogs blood vessels, forcing the heart to work harder and eventually fail."

SENS Research Foundation 

From 2003 to 2009, Methuselah Foundation served as the backbone organization for the strategies for engineered negligible senescence (SENS) program, a long-term research framework developed by Aubrey de Grey. The SENS program aims to prevent or reverse seven forms of molecular or cellular damage associated with aging.

During that time, de Grey and David Gobel established SENS-related research programs on human bioremedial biology – "getting the crud out" in Methuselah's parlance – at Rice University and Arizona State University. The programs were the first use of environmental remediation principles directed at reversing "pollution" in human cells. Additionally, Methuselah sponsored a series of SENS-focused roundtables and conferences, and funded the writing of Ending Aging, co-authored by de Grey and Michael Rae.

Under de Grey's continued leadership, SENS spun out from Methuselah as the SENS Research Foundation in 2009.

Monetary support 

Due to the close relationship between the Methuselah Foundation and SENS Research Foundation and their common activities, there are sometimes misunderstandings about their budgets, directions, and amounts of donations which can be distributed between these organizations for various purposes.

In 2004, the Methuselah Foundation began a donor initiative called "The Methuselah 300" ("The 300"), a community of philanthropic donors pledging $25,000 over 25 years, at a minimum of $1,000 annually, toward the organization. The initiative was named after the 300 Spartans who held the pass at Thermopylae in 480 BC during the Greco-Persian War. In addition, in 2015, the foundation began memorializing The 300 donors with a monument at St. Thomas Island in the U.S. Virgin Islands.

On September 16, 2006, Peter Thiel, co-founder and former CEO of the online payments system PayPal, announced that he was pledging $3.5 million to the Methuselah Foundation and the SENS programs "to support scientific research into the alleviation and eventual reversal of the debilities caused by aging".

In 2007, Justin Bonomo, a professional poker player, pledged 5% of his tournament winnings to SENS research.

In January 2018, the anonymous principal of the Pineapple Fund donated $1 million to the Methuselah Foundation, in addition to $2 million donated to SENS Research Foundation.

On May 12, 2021, Vitalik Buterin, a cryptocurrency scientist and magnate, made a series of donations to the foundation. The three transfers, made minutes apart, contained 432 trillion Dogelon Mars, worth about  $336 million at the time of transfer, and two transfers of 1000 Ether in total, worth more than $2 million.

References

External links
 
 Methuselah Fund
 New Organ

Life extension organizations
Medicine awards
Biology awards
Awards established in 2003
Organizations established in 2003
Health charities in the United States
Non-profit organizations based in Springfield, Virginia
Charities based in Virginia
Medical and health organizations based in Virginia